Victor Backman may refer to:
 Victor Backman (ice hockey)
 Victor Backman (footballer)